The 2019 Major League Rugby season was the second season of Major League Rugby, the professional rugby union competition sanctioned by USA Rugby. The regular season began on January 26 and concluded on June 2.

Two teams made their debut in 2019, the Toronto Arrows and Rugby United New York. The Seattle Seawolves won the championship for the second consecutive season, defeating the San Diego Legion 26-23 on June 16.

Teams 

Notes:

Regular season
The regular season was expanded from ten weeks in 2018 to nineteen weeks for 2019, with each team playing 16 matches.

Standings 
The standings for the 2019 Major League Rugby regular season are:

Matches
The following are the matches for the 2019 Major League Rugby regular season:

Updated to match(es) played on  
Colors: Blue: home team win; Yellow: draw; Red: away team win.

Week 1

Week 2

Week 3

Week 4

Week 5

Week 6

Week 7

Week 8

Week 9

Week 10

Week 11

Week 12

Week 13

Week 14

Week 15

Week 16

Week 17

Week 18

Week 19

Playoffs

Semifinals

Final

Players Statistics

Top scorers

The top ten try and point scorers during the 2019 Major League Rugby season are:

Last updated June 5, 2019

Sanctions

Awards
MVP of the Championship Match

All-MLR Awards

All-MLR First Team

All-MLR Second Team

Attendances 

Notes:

References

Major League Rugby seasons
Major League Rugby
Major League Rugby
Major League Rugby